Anne Bodenham (died 1653) was an English woman who was executed for witchcraft. 

Anne Bodenham was the assistant of John Lambe and worked as a cunning woman in Salisbury. 

She was accused of witchcraft by Anne Styles, who was charged with poison murder at the time. Anne Styles stated that Anne Bodenham had made a pact with Satan and had attempted to convince her to do the same.   
According to rumours at the time, she could summon demons and transform herself into a dog, lion, bear, wolf, or monkey.

Anne Bodenham was examined for the Devil's mark. She was convincted as charged. 

She was executed by hanging in Salisbury in 1653.

Legacy
Her case was the subject of the pamhplet treatise Bower, Edmond. Doctor Lamb Revived, or, Witchcraft Condemned in Anne Bodenham. London: 1653 as well as Doctor Lambs Darling. London: 1653.

Henry More of Cambrigde examined the case carefully and presented it as a case of the existence of witchcraft in a book about witchcraft he published in 1655, which was given much authority in a time period when England experienced its last intense witch hunt.

References

 Wallace Notestein A History of Witchcraft in England from 1558 to 1718
 Natasha Korda Working Subjects in Early Modern English Drama
 Diane Purkiss The Witch in History: Early Modern and Twentieth-Century Representations
 Dr Orna Alyagon Darr Marks of an Absolute Witch: Evidentiary Dilemmas in Early Modern England
 WITCHES IN EARLY MODERN ENGLAND

17th-century English people
Witch trials in England
People executed for witchcraft
1653 deaths
17th-century executions by England
Cunning folk